Kurdsat Broadcasting Corporation is a satellite television station in Kurdistan Region, Iraq, broadcasting since 8 January 2000. It belongs to the Patriotic Union of Kurdistan (PUK) and is based in Sulaymaniyah.

The channel broadcast programs in Kurdish. Other languages such as Persian, English and Arabic were also used in some programs with Kurdish subtitles. First established following the Gulf War, Kurdsat was among the Kurdish satellite stations in Kurdistan.

See also
 List of Kurdish-language television channels

References

Television stations in Kurdistan Region (Iraq)
Television stations in Iraq
Kurdish-language television stations
Mass media in Sulaymaniyah
Television channels and stations established in 2000
2000 establishments in Iraqi Kurdistan